Michel  Soro (born 30 October 1987) is a French professional boxer. He challenged for the WBO and IBO light middleweight titles in 2012, and the WBA interim super welterweight title in 2017. At regional level, he held the EBU European middleweight title, the WBO European junior middleweight title twice, and the WBA International super welterweight title. As of November 2020, Soro is ranked is the world’s eighth best active light middleweight by The Ring magazine and seventh best by the Transnational Boxing Rankings Board.

Professional career

In 2017, he challenged Brian Castaño for the interim WBA Jr. Middleweight title, losing by split decision.

In his next fight, Soro bounced back with a third round stoppage against Ivan Montero. He was the aggressor from the opening bell, and managed to drop his opponent in the third round, who was not able to beat the count with 1:53 left on the clock.

On 8th December, 2018, Soro got an easy stoppage win over American Greg Vendetti.

After that fight, Soro was scheduled to a rematch against Brian Castano. However, the fight fell through, with Castano's team alleging that Soro's team did not want to deposit Castano's purse, nor provide evidence of VADA testing.

On 15th November, 2019, Soro continued his dominant streak, with another one-sided victory, this time against French veteran Cedric Vitu. Soro's aggression throughout the fight culminated with a left hook to Vitu's temple in the fifth round, which sent Vitu on the canvas and forced the referee to stop the fight.

Professional boxing record

References

External links

Michel Soro - Profile, News Archive & Current Rankings at Box.Live

1987 births
Living people
Light-middleweight boxers
Middleweight boxers
People from Villeurbanne
Sportspeople from Lyon Metropolis
French sportspeople of Ivorian descent
Ivorian male boxers
French male boxers